Gwyn Clarkston Shea (born August 3, 1937) is an American politician from Texas. A member of the Republican Party, she served as the Texas State Representative for the 98th district from 1983 to 1993. Shea also served as the 103rd Secretary of State of Texas from 2002 to 2003 under Governor Rick Perry. She was appointed to the office following the resignation of Henry Cuellar.

References

1937 births
People from Irving, Texas
Republican Party members of the Texas House of Representatives
Secretaries of State of Texas
Texas local politicians
Businesspeople from Texas
Women state legislators in Texas
Baptists from Texas
Living people
Burials at Texas State Cemetery
Dallas Baptist University alumni
21st-century American women